Gjirokastër Airfield  is an airfield located near Gjirokastër, Gjirokastër, Albania.

History
The airfield was initially put in operation in 1929 when there were scheduled domestic flights between Gjirokastër and Tirana and was mainly used for public and military purposes. The airfield is located about 1 km east of the city of Gjirokaster. The last aircraft to land was a state-owned plane dating back to February 26, 1991, when the former Albanian president Ramiz Alia was visiting Gjirokastra for the last time. Several attempts have been made to revive the airfield and in 2021 6 light aircraft from North Macedonia and Kosovo landed successfully at the airfield. The aim is to turn the airfield into an air sport and tourism destination throughout the year. Eventually, the airfield was certified for touristic and sportive purposes by the Albanian Aviation Authority in July 2022 and it was assigned the code LAGK.

See also
List of airports in Albania

References 

Airports in Albania
Buildings and structures in Gjirokastër